Merryvale is a rural locality in the Scenic Rim Region, Queensland, Australia.

Geography
Merryvale is a predominantly agricultural area.

Demographics 
Its male/female populations were 52.0% and 48.0%, respectively, with a median age of 34, four years below the national average.

Education
Merryvale Provisional School opened on 10 September 1894. It closed in 1904 due to low enrolment, and reopened on 5 March 1906 as Franklyn Vale Provisional School. On 1 January 1909, it became Franklyn Vale Provisional School, but again closed in 1915 due to low attendance. In 1922, it was moved back to Merryvale, reopening on 15 May 1922 as Merryvale State School. It celebrated its 50th jubilee on 7 August 1947. It closed again in 1950, reopened, then finally closed in 1961. The nearest government primary school is Warrill View State School in Warrill View to the east. The nearest government secondary school is Rosewood State High School in Rosewood to the north-east.

References 

Scenic Rim Region
Localities in Queensland